Denis Leonidovich Sytnik (Russian: Денис Сытник; born 14 October 1986 in Ukraine) is a Ukrainian retired footballer who last played for Victoria Hotspurs in Malta.

Career

Sytnik started his senior career with Komunalnyk Luhansk. In 2012, he signed for Petrolul Ploiești in the Romanian Liga I, where he made three league appearances and scored zero goals. After that, he played for Ungmennafélag Grindavíkur, Knattspyrnufélagið Þróttur, Tytan Donetsk, Marsaskala, Senglea Athletic, Luqa St. Andrew's, and Victoria Hotspurs before retiring.

References

External links 
 
 
 Denis SYTNIK: “Only Andrey Shevchenko knows”
 Denis SYTNIK - A look at Icelandic football from the inside
 Denis Sytnik: Iceland plays football with a soul!
 Kievlyanin, to play Malta, asked FIFA for permissions
 Denis Sytnik: "The Maltese are already used to their frequent defeats. But always dissatisfied with the judges"

Living people
1986 births
Footballers from Kyiv
Ukrainian footballers
Association football forwards
FC Komunalnyk Luhansk players
FC Hirnyk-Sport Horishni Plavni players
FC Petrolul Ploiești players
Íþróttabandalag Vestmannaeyja players
Grindavík men's football players
Knattspyrnufélagið Þróttur players
FC Tytan Donetsk players
Marsaskala F.C. players
Liga I players
Ukrainian expatriate footballers
Expatriate footballers in Iceland
Ukrainian expatriate sportspeople in Iceland
Expatriate footballers in Romania
Ukrainian expatriate sportspeople in Romania
Expatriate footballers in Malta
Ukrainian expatriate sportspeople in Malta